Pickens County Airport  is a county-owned, public-use airport in Pickens County, Georgia, United States. It is located two nautical miles (3.7 km) southwest of the central business district of Jasper, Georgia. As per the FAA's National Plan of Integrated Airport Systems for 2009-2013, it is classified as a general aviation airport.

Although most U.S. airports use the same three-letter location identifier for the FAA and IATA, this airport is assigned JZP by the FAA but has no designation from the IATA.

Facilities and aircraft 
It has one runway designated 16/34 with an asphalt surface measuring 5,000 by 100 feet (1,524 x 30 m).

For the 12-month period ending December 31, 2018, the airport had 30,660 general aviation aircraft operations, an average of 84/per day. At that time there were 83 aircraft based at this airport: 78 single-engine, 3 multi-engine, and 2 helicopter and 13%.

References

External links 
 Aerial photo as of 27 January 1999 from USGS The National Map
 
 

Airports in Georgia (U.S. state)
Transportation in Pickens County, Georgia
Buildings and structures in Pickens County, Georgia